Daniel Thomas O'Bannon (September 30, 1946 – December 17, 2009) was an American film screenwriter, director and  visual effects supervisor, usually in the science fiction and horror genres.

O'Bannon wrote the screenplay for Alien, adapted from a story he wrote with Ronald Shusett. He also wrote and directed the cult horror comedy The Return of the Living Dead. He contributed computer animation to Star Wars and worked on cult classics such as Dark Star, Heavy Metal, and Total Recall.

Early life
O'Bannon was born in St. Louis, Missouri, the son of Bertha (née Lowenthal) and Thomas Sidney O'Bannon, a carpenter. During his childhood he was a science fiction and horror enthusiast. He attended the art school of Washington University in St. Louis, where he did stand-up comedy routines, did make-up for campus theater productions, and provided illustrations for Student Life, the student newspaper.  While there he roomed with future movie producer Michael Shamberg. O'Bannon moved home briefly after Washington University and attended Florissant Valley Junior College where he wrote and directed a short science fiction satire titled "The Attack of the 50-foot Chicken." O'Bannon also attended MacMurray College in Jacksonville, Illinois. During this period he pursued a psychology degree, but later became interested in becoming a film director. According to O'Bannon, he was reading an issue of Playboy when he found an article discussing the best film schools, which led him to the University of Southern California (USC). He received a bachelor's degree in film from USC in 1970. While at USC he lived near the Los Angeles Campus in an old two-story house affectionately called the "Menlo Manor" which he shared with other USC students (Don Jakoby, who collaborated on several screenplays with Dan including Blue Thunder; and Jeffrey J. Lee). As a student, O'Bannon spent many late nights in old Hollywood editing his and other student films.

Career

1970s
It was at USC that he met John Carpenter and collaborated with him on a student film,  which they eventually expanded into the feature-length science fiction movie Dark Star. Part of the movie was filmed at Menlo Manor. Released in 1974, it had a final budget of only US$60,000. O'Bannon served in a number of capacities, including scripting, acting in one of the leading roles ("Sergeant Pinback") and editing, for which he used a 1940s Moviola. In 1975, Dark Star won the Golden Scroll award (the Saturn Awards' original name) for Best Special Effects.

He was retained to supervise special effects for an Alejandro Jodorowsky production of Frank Herbert's Dune. That project fell apart in 1976 and the movie was never made, reportedly because the major Hollywood studios were wary of financing the picture with Jodorowsky as director. O'Bannon's role is prominently featured in the 2013 documentary Jodorowsky's Dune. The collapse of Dune left O'Bannon broke, homeless, and dependent on friends for his survival. According to The Guardian, "George Lucas was impressed enough with his hand-animated, faux computer screen graphics to hire him to do similar work on Star Wars, but otherwise this was an incredibly lean period for him." He eventually abandoned technical film work for scriptwriting. While living with his friend Ronald Shusett, they came up with the story for O'Bannon's career-making film Alien (1979), for which he wrote the screenplay and supervised visuals.

1980s
In 1981, O'Bannon helped create the animated feature Heavy Metal, writing two of its segments ("Soft Landing" and "B-17").  O'Bannon voiced his displeasure with his next big-budget outing, John Badham's Blue Thunder (1983), an action film about a Los Angeles helicopter surveillance team. Originally written with Don Jakoby, Blue Thunder also underwent extensive rewriting, losing some of its political content.  He and Jakoby also scripted Lifeforce (1985), a movie based on Colin Wilson's novel The Space Vampires and directed by Tobe Hooper that veers from alien visitation to vampirism and an apocalyptic ending. It was not well received at the time, and was considered a box office flop.  O'Bannon would again collaborate with Jakoby and Hooper for the 1986 remake Invaders from Mars. Purists considered it inferior to the 1950s original and it also performed poorly at the box office. O'Bannon also worked as a consultant for C.H.U.D., helping to create the design concept for the title creatures.

In 1985, O'Bannon moved into the director's chair with The Return of the Living Dead, a sequel to George Romero's Night of the Living Dead. Like Alien, the film met with success, spawned numerous sequels, and became a cult classic. That year, he was awarded the Inkpot Award.

1990s
In 1990, O'Bannon and Shusett again teamed up as writers on Total Recall, an adaptation of the short story We Can Remember It for You Wholesale by Philip K. Dick.  This was a project the two had been working on since collaborating on Alien. With a cast featuring Sharon Stone and Arnold Schwarzenegger, Total Recall earned well over US$100 million.  

An earlier screenplay by the duo titled Hemoglobin was also produced as the low budget feature Bleeders (1997).

O'Bannon's second directorial feature, The Resurrected (1991), was a low-budget horror effort released direct-to-video. Based on the writings of H. P. Lovecraft, it focused on a family's ancient rituals that awaken the dead. In 1995, O'Bannon received a co-writing credit for the sci-fi film Screamers adapted from the Philip K. Dick story "Second Variety", having written the initial version of the screenplay with Michael Campus in the early 1980s.

2000s

In 2001, O'Bannon was the filmmaker-in-residence at Chapman University's Dodge College of Film and Media Arts.

O'Bannon and Shusett were credited as writers on the 2004 science fiction film Alien vs. Predator, a prequel to Alien.

Posthumous

In 2013, Dan O'Bannon's Guide to Screenplay Structure was released, co-written with Matt R. Lohr.

Personal life and death
He and his wife Diane had a son, Adam. O'Bannon died from complications of Crohn's disease in Los Angeles on December 17, 2009. He credited his experiences with Crohn's for inspiring the chest-bursting scene from Alien.

Filmography

Also uncredited re-writer in Phobia (1980).

References

External links
 
 
 December 2007 Den Of Geek interview with Dan O'Bannon

1946 births
2009 deaths
20th-century American male actors
20th-century American male writers
20th-century American screenwriters
21st-century American screenwriters
American male film actors
American film directors
American male screenwriters
American science fiction writers
Deaths from Crohn's disease
Hugo Award-winning writers
Inkpot Award winners
Male actors from St. Louis
USC School of Cinematic Arts alumni
Horror film directors
Screenwriting instructors
Writers of books about writing fiction
Screenwriters from Missouri
21st-century American male writers